Idalis M. DeLeón (born June 15, 1969) is an American singer, actress, and television host. DeLeón is best known as an MTV VJ, hosting  the music countdown show from June 1994 until September 1998. DeLeón is also known for her acting roles as Roni De Santos during the fifth season of the sitcom Living Single (1997–1998) and Charity in the 1998 comedy film Ride.

Career
DeLeón, who is of Puerto Rican ancestry, first began her career in the South Bronx, New York City, as a member of the girl group Seduction, who scored a top ten hit "Two to Make It Right" in 1989. As an entertainment reporter and anchor, DeLeón has worked for VH1, Fox Family, Fox Sports, Access Hollywood, and since 2003 as the weekend hostess for Extra. Since 2004 DeLeón has also been the co-host of the Sí TV show Breakfast, Lunch, and Dinner. She also has several acting credits including a recurring role on the Sci Fi Channel series The Invisible Man. In 2004, she played the stripper Sophia in eight episodes of Six Feet Under. Her most recent appearances include roles on FX's Nip/Tuck, and as "Concha" on the USA Network's Burn Notice.

Filmography

Film

Television

References

External links

1969 births
Living people
American women singers
American film actresses
American television actresses
American television personalities
American actresses of Puerto Rican descent
American musicians of Puerto Rican descent
VJs (media personalities)
Place of birth missing (living people)